Ralph Cornall (17 March 1894 – 19 October 1984) was an Australian rules footballer who played with Essendon in the Victorian Football League (VFL).

Notes

External links 
		

1894 births
1984 deaths
Australian rules footballers from Victoria (Australia)
Essendon Football Club players
North Melbourne Football Club (VFA) players
Australian military personnel of World War I